The 7th Legislative Assembly of Ontario was in session from June 5, 1890, until May 29, 1894, just prior to the 1894 general election. The majority party was the Ontario Liberal Party  led by Oliver Mowat.

Thomas Ballantyne served as speaker for the assembly.

Notes

References

External links 
A History of Ontario : its resources and development., Alexander Fraser
Members in Parliament 7

07
1890 establishments in Ontario
1894 disestablishments in Ontario